Associação Atlética Internacional may refer to the following Brazilian football clubs:

Associação Atlética Internacional (Bebedouro), a club from Bebedouro, São Paulo state
Associação Atlética Internacional (Limeira), a club from Limeira, São Paulo state